Funland is a 1987 American dark comedy film directed by Michael A. Simpson, who co-wrote the screenplay with Bonnie and Terry Turner. It follows a disgruntled clown who takes revenge on the staff of an amusement park who fired him. It was filmed at Six Flags Over Georgia in Austell, Georgia.

Plot
Funland is a family-oriented amusement park owned by the eccentric Angus Perry. Niel Stickney, the clown mascot and one of the founders of the park and its former accountant, suffered a nervous breakdown and his grip on reality is slowly deteriorating. After the mob kills Angus and takes over the park, Stickney begins to have increasingly bizarre hallucinations, including envisioning the patrons of the park cafeteria spontaneously breaking into song and dance and seeing visions of the dead Angus. He then begins to believe himself to be his clown persona, Bruce Burger. After the new mafia management fires him, he finally snaps. He steals a briefcase containing a rifle, intending to kill his replacement and reclaim the theme park. While firing the gun the mob bosses two sons recognize the sound and investigate. Bruce then shoots and kills the mob bosses son in self defense. The film ends with Neil Stickney (Bruce Burger) owning and running the park.

Cast
William Windom as Angus Perry
David L. Lander as Niel Stickney/Bruce Burger
Bruce Mahler as Mike Spencer
Robert Sacchi as Mario DiMauro
Clark Brandon as Doug Sutterfield
Jill Carroll as Denise Wilson
Michael McManus as T. G. Hurley
Mary Beth McDonough as Kristin Cumming 
Terry Beaver as Carl DiMauro
Lane Davies as Chad Peller
Richard Reiner as Larry DiMauro
Bonnie Turner as Darlene Dorkner
Jan Hooks as Shelly Willingham
Randal Patrick as Chip Cox
Gene Murrell as Randy Grossman

Home media
It was released on VHS and, in 2004, DVD.

References

External links
 

1987 films
1987 comedy films
1980s black comedy films
1980s English-language films
American films about revenge
American black comedy films
Comedy films about clowns
Films set in amusement parks
Films shot in Georgia (U.S. state)
Films with screenplays by Bonnie and Terry Turner
1980s American films